Eutrochatella is a genus of tropical land snail, a terrestrial gastropod mollusk in the family Helicinidae.

Species 
According to the World Register of Marine Species, the following species are accepted within Eutrochatella:

 Eutrochatella acklinsensis Clench, 1963
 Eutrochatella beatensis Bartsch, 1932
 Eutrochatella blandii (Weinland, 1880) 
 Eutrochatella browniana (Weinland, 1880) 
 Eutrochatella bryanti (L. Pfeiffer, 1867) 
 Eutrochatella calida (Weinland, 1862) 
 Eutrochatella candida (L. Pfeiffer, 1858) 
 Eutrochatella chittyana (L. Pfeiffer, 1858) 
 Eutrochatella circumlineata (Tryon, 1866) 
 Eutrochatella costata (Gray, 1824) 
 Eutrochatella eugeniana (Weinland, 1862) 
 Eutrochatella globosa (G. B. Sowerby I, 1839) 
 Eutrochatella klinei Clench, 1959
 Eutrochatella nobilis (C. B. Adams, 1851) 
 Eutrochatella opima (Shuttleworth, 1852) 
 Eutrochatella pulchella (Gray, 1824) 
 Eutrochatella remota (Poey, 1858) 
 Eutrochatella tankervillii (Gray, 1824) 
 Eutrochatella virginea (I. Lea, 1832)

References

External links 
 Fischer, P. (1880-1887). Manuel de conchyliologie et de paléontologie conchyliologique, ou histoire naturelle des mollusques vivants et fossiles suivi d'un Appendice sur les Brachiopodes par D. P. Oehlert. Avec 23 planches contenant 600 figures dessinées par S. P. Woodward.. Paris: F. Savy. Published in 11 parts (fascicules), xxiv + 1369 pp., 23 pls

Helicinidae
Gastropods described in 1885